Lax̱ Ksiluux is the name of a former First Nations community in northwestern British Columbia, Canada. It existed on the south side of the Nass River near a creek known as Ts'oohl Ts'ap.

Lax̱ Ksiluux was in existence prior to the eruption of Tseax Cone in the 18th century which buried the community with thick lava flows along with the nearby community of Wii Lax K'abit.

See also
Nisga'a Memorial Lava Bed Provincial Park

References

Nisga'a
Nass Country
Natural disasters in British Columbia